Reprudencia Sonkey, known professionally as Dencia, is a Cameroonian singer, entrepreneur and fashion designer. She was born in Cameroon and attended her primary school education at The Government English Primary School at Lake Central in Yaoundé and later on went for her secondary school education at Cameroon Protestant College (CPC) Bali in the North West Region of Cameroon. She started in the industry being featured in music videos of artists like Chris Brown, 50 Cent, Lady Gaga, and Ludacris. Dencia released her debut single “Beri Beri” in 2011.

As a designer, she has created looks for artists like Nicki Minaj, Rihanna, Christina Milian, and Lil’ Mama,
and is known for her own fashion statements and appearances on red carpets at the Billboard Music Awards, the Grammys, and the American Music Awards.

In 2014, Dencia launched her skincare line, Whitenicious, infamously including a skin lightening & brightening creams.

References

External links

1978 births
Living people
Women pop singers
21st-century Cameroonian women singers